Carlos Almeida (born 20 March 1968) is a Cape Verdean long-distance runner.

Career
Almeida first competed for Cape Verde at the 2000 IAAF World Cross Country Championships in Vilamoura, Portugal where he placed 138th in the Men's short race in a time of 13:29. At the 25th running of Madrid Marathon in April 2002, Almeida recorded a personal best time of 2:25:50. The following year at the 2003 World Championships in Athletics in Paris, he finished 69th in the marathon with a time of 2:33:31.

Personal bests
Below is Carlos Almeida's personal best times.

References

1968 births
Living people
Cape Verdean male long-distance runners
Cape Verdean male marathon runners